The Oromocto River is a tributary of the Saint John River in southwest New Brunswick, Canada.

North Branch Oromocto River,  in length, flows east-northeast from Oromocto Lake (near Harvey Station), passing through the villages of Tracy and follows sections of Route 645 and Route 101 to Fredericton Junction.

See also
List of bodies of water of New Brunswick

Rivers of New Brunswick